The following is a list of the MTV Europe Music Award winners and nominees for Best Cover.

1990s

MTV Europe Music Awards

Awards established in 1994
1994 establishments in Europe